Chanko is a village in Botlikh district in Dagestan, Russia.

Geographical location 
It is Located 6 km north of the Botlikh Village, on the left bank of the Chankovskaya river.

Notable people 

 Anvar Ibragimgadzhiyev (born 1991) - Russian footballer.

Language 
The villagers speak the Andi language. In 1981, a linguistic expedition was undertaken by the Department of Structural and Applied Linguistics of the Faculty of Philology MSU led by A. E. Kibrika.

References 

 Photo of the village

Geography of Dagestan